Filip Oršula (born 25 February 1993) is a Slovak footballer who plays as a winger or a second striker.

Club career
The pre-season friendly with Wigan Athletic match began well for Oršula, as he made a goal-scoring debut, against Stockport County. He debuted for the first team on 25 September 2012, in the League Cup match against West Ham United.

He was on trial at NEC Nijmegen in July 2013 and played in a friendly match against Quick 1888 (0–5).

MSV Duisburg
On 24 July 2013, he joined MSV Duisburg on a two-year contract.

Dinamo Tbilisi
After spending half of season with Spartak Trnava, Oršula had signed a two-year contract with reigning Georgian champions Dinamo Tbilisi, in January 2020. He had joined the squad earlier during a winter training camp in Turkey.

International career
Oršula was first called up to the senior national team for two unofficial friendly fixtures held in Abu Dhabi, UAE, in January 2017, against Uganda and Sweden. He made his debut against Uganda, being fielded from the start until the 85th minute, when he was substituted for Pavol Šafranko. Slovakia went on to lose the game 1–3. He also played the last thirty minutes of a match against Sweden, which Slovakia lost 0–6, when he replaced Dávid Guba.

References

External links

1993 births
Living people
Slovak footballers
Slovak expatriate footballers
Association football forwards
Slovak Super Liga players
3. Liga players
Erovnuli Liga players
2. Liga (Slovakia) players
Czech First League players
Manchester City F.C. players
FC Twente players
Wigan Athletic F.C. players
MSV Duisburg players
Spartak Myjava players
ŠK Slovan Bratislava players
FC Spartak Trnava players
FC Dinamo Tbilisi players
FC Slovan Liberec players
FK Senica players
People from Prievidza District
Sportspeople from the Trenčín Region
Expatriate footballers in England
Expatriate footballers in the Netherlands
Expatriate footballers in Germany
Expatriate footballers in the Czech Republic
Expatriate footballers in Georgia (country)
Slovak expatriate sportspeople in England
Slovak expatriate sportspeople in the Netherlands
Slovak expatriate sportspeople in Germany
Slovak expatriate sportspeople in the Czech Republic
Slovak expatriate sportspeople in Georgia (country)